Charles Arling (22 August 1875 – 21 April 1922) was a Canadian actor of the silent era. He appeared in more than 100 films between 1909 and 1922. He was born in Toronto, Ontario, Canada and died on 21 April 1922 from pneumonia at the age of 46 in Los Angeles.

Selected filmography

 In Little Italy (1909)
 In the Border States (1910)
 A Mohawk's Way (1910)
 Sweet Memories (1911)
 September Morn (1914)
 That Little Band of Gold (1915)
 Court House Crooks (1915)
 Chased Into Love (1917)
 Nuts in May (1917)
 Mile-a-Minute Kendall (1918)
 The Border Wireless (1918)
 No Man's Land (1918)
 Smiles (1919)
 The Turn in the Road (1919)
 Back to God's Country (1919)
 In Old Kentucky (1919)
 The Woman in Room 13 (1920)
 The Jack-Knife Man (1920)
 The Desperate Hero (1920)
 Number 99 (1920)
 Blue Streak McCoy (1920)
 A Daughter of the Law (1921)
 Her Night of Nights (1922)
 When Romance Rides (1922)
 The Gray Dawn (1922)
 A Wonderful Wife (1922)

See also
Other Canadian pioneers in early Hollywood

References

External links

1880 births
1922 deaths
Canadian male film actors
20th-century Canadian male actors
Male actors from Toronto
Canadian expatriate male actors in the United States
Deaths from pneumonia in California